Aoste is a commune in the Isère department in the Auvergne-Rhône-Alpes region of southeastern France.

The inhabitants of the commune are known as Aostiens or Aostiennes, alternatively Dutards or Dutardes

Geography
Aoste is located some 15 km east of La Tour-du-Pin and 8 km north-east of Les Abrets. Access is by the D1516 road from La Batie-Montgascon in the west passing through the village and continuing north-east to Champagneux. The D82F also runs off this road just west of the village and goes north-west to Corbelin. The D40 road from Les Avenieres in the north passes down the eastern side of the commune and continues to Romagnieu. The D592 branches off the D40 on the northern border and goes south to the village continuing to Chimilin in the south. Apart from the village there are also the hamlets of Saint-Didier in the north at the intersection of the D592 and the D40, and Les Champagnes in the east which is really an extension of the urban area of Saint-Genix-sur-Guiers across the border. The rest of the commune is entirely farmland except for the large industrial complex of Jambon d'Aoste north of the village.

The eastern border of the commune is formed by the Guiers river which flows north to join the Rhône which forms the north-eastern border of the commune. The Rhône is the border between Isère and Ain departments while the Guiers is the border between Isère and Savoie departments. The Bièvre river also flows through the west of the commune from the south forming the northern border before joining the Rhone. Numerous other small waterways join the Bièvre.

Neighbouring communes and villages

History
Aoste was a vicus at a crossroad of Roman roads to Italy, to Germania, and to the Roman colonies of Lugdunum and Vienna. Its name appears on the Tabula Peutingeriana as Augustum.

In 2006 archaeological excavations unearthed a pottery workshop dating from the late Middle Ages.

Administration
List of Successive Mayors

Mayors from 1935

Demography
In 2017 the commune had 2,878 inhabitants.

Economy

Jambon Aoste

The pork products produced in Isère department and especially the Jambon Aoste (Aoste Ham) are manufactured exclusively in this Groupe Aoste factory which was owned by the industrial group Sara Lee Corporation who ceased their activities in deli products and resold the operation to the American buyer Smithfield Foods through which it passed to the Chinese group Shuanghui in September 2013.

These industrial products with the "Jambon Aoste" label should not be confused with the official name "Vallée d'Aoste Jambon de Bosses" which is a ham produced in the Aosta Valley (An Italian/French Valley) and which has a protected designation of origin. The Ham products produced in Isère have a simple trademark and no Label Rouge, AOC or PDO regulates its production of cooked or raw ham, unlike the Italian Aosta ham which is a vintage handmade product made in very small quantities.

Sites and Monuments

An Ancient Roman settlement with an oven and many relics and an archaeological museum.
The School contains three items which are registered as historical objects:
A Domestic Oratory (Gallo-Roman)
An Altar (Gallo-Roman)
2 Commemorative Plaques (Gallo-Roman)
The Chapel of Saint-Didier contains several items that are registered as historical objects:
A Thurible (18th century)
A Processional Cross (16th century)
6 ex-voto Commemorative Plaques (Gallo-Roman)
3 Funeral Plaques (Middle Ages)

Protected Natural Areas
The commune has two natural zones of ecological interest, fauna and flora of type I:
the alluvial areas of the Rhône du Pont de Groslée à Murs-et-Gélignieux
the Pools of Paluette

See also
Communes of the Isère department

References

External links
Aoste on the National Geographic Institute website 
Aoste on Géoportail, National Geographic Institute (IGN) website 
Aouste on the 1750 Cassini Map

Communes of Isère